NGC 4482 is a dwarf elliptical galaxy located about 60 million light-years away in the constellation Virgo. NGC 4482 was discovered by astronomer William Herschel on March 15, 1784. It was rediscovered by astronomer Arnold Schwassmann on September 6, 1900 and was listed as IC 3427. It is a member of the Virgo Cluster.

See also
 List of NGC objects (4001–5000)
 Messier 32
 NGC 4458

References

External links

Dwarf elliptical galaxies
Virgo (constellation)
4482
IC objects
41272
7640
Astronomical objects discovered in 1784
Virgo Cluster